Lezhi railway station is a planned railway station in Lezhi County, Ziyang, Sichuan, China. It will be located at the crossing point of the Second Chengdu–Chongqing high-speed railway and the Chengdu–Dazhou–Wanzhou high-speed railway and will have platforms on both lines.

References 

Railway stations in Sichuan
Railway stations under construction in China